Tremex magus is a species sawfly, native to most of Europe and parts of Russia.

References

Siricidae
Insects described in 1787
Hymenoptera of Europe